Kurzia pauciflora is a species of liverwort belonging to the family Lepidoziaceae.

It is native to Eurasia and Northern America.

References

Lepidoziaceae
Taxa named by James Dickson (botanist)